Judge Wright may refer to:

Caleb Merrill Wright (1908–2001), judge of the United States District Court for the District of Delaware
Eugene Allen Wright (1913–2002), judge of the United States Court of Appeals for the Ninth Circuit
Francis Marion Wright (1844–1917), judge of the United States District Court for the Eastern District of Illinois
J. Skelly Wright (1911–1988), judge of the United States Court of Appeals for the District of Columbia Circuit
Lawrence A. Wright (1927–2000), judge of the United States Tax Court
Otis D. Wright II (born 1944), judge of the United States District Court for the Central District of California
Scott Olin Wright (1923–2016), judge of the United States District Court for the Western District of Missouri
Susan Webber Wright (born 1948), judge of the United States District Court for the Eastern District of Arkansas
Wilhelmina Wright (born 1964), judge of the United States District Court for the District of Minnesota

See also
Justice Wright (disambiguation)